William Rory Gallagher (2 March 1948 – 14 June 1995) was an Irish guitarist, singer and songwriter. He formed the blues rock trio Taste in 1966, which experienced some moderate success in the UK. He also found success with a solo career releasing music throughout the 1970s and 1980s and selling more than 30 million records worldwide.

Gallagher is known for his virtuosic style of guitar playing, which strongly influenced other guitarists such as Brian May and Eric Clapton. But, due to his lack of commercial success, he is often referred as "the greatest guitarist you've never heard of". Gallagher was voted as guitarist of the year by Melody Maker magazine in 1972, and listed as the 57th greatest guitarist of all time by Rolling Stone magazine.

Gallagher was born in Ballyshannon, County Donegal, and raised in Cork, Munster. His popularity had declined throughout the 1980s due to changes within the music industry and poor health. Gallagher received a liver transplant in 1995, but died of complications later that same year in London at the age of 47.

Early life
Gallagher was born in Ballyshannon, County Donegal in 1948. His father Daniel was employed by the Irish Electricity Supply Board, who were constructing Cathaleen's Fall hydroelectric power station on the Erne River above the town. The family moved to Derry City, where his younger brother Dónal was born in 1949. Dónal would act as Rory's manager through most of his career.

His mother, Monica, and the two boys later moved to Cork, where the brothers were raised. Rory attended North Monastery School. Daniel Gallagher had played the accordion and sang with the Tír Chonaill Céilí Band while in Donegal; their mother Monica was a singer and acted with the Abbey Players in Ballyshannon. The Theatre in Ballyshannon where Monica once acted is now called the Rory Gallagher Theatre.

Both sons were musically inclined and encouraged by their parents to pursue music. At age nine, Gallagher received his first guitar from them. He built on his burgeoning ability on ukulele in teaching himself to play the guitar and perform at minor functions. After winning a cash prize in a talent contest when he was twelve, he bought his next guitar. Gallagher began performing in his adolescence with both his acoustic guitar, and an electric guitar. However, it was a 1961 Fender Stratocaster, which he purchased three years later for £100 that became his primary instrument and was most associated with him during his career.

Gallagher was initially attracted to skiffle after hearing Lonnie Donegan on the radio. Donegan frequently covered blues and folk performers from the United States. He relied entirely on radio programs and television. Occasionally, the BBC would play some blues numbers, and he slowly found some song books for guitar, where he found the names of the actual composers of blues pieces.

While still in school, playing songs by Buddy Holly and Eddie Cochran, he discovered his greatest influence in Muddy Waters. He began experimenting with folk, blues, and rock music. Unable to find or afford record albums, Gallagher stayed up late to hear Radio Luxembourg and AFN where the radio brought him his only exposure to the actual songwriters and musicians whose music moved him most.

Influences he discovered, and cited as he progressed, included Woody Guthrie, Big Bill Broonzy, and Lead Belly. Singing and later using a brace for his harmonica, Gallagher taught himself to play slide guitar. Further, throughout the next few years of his musical development, Gallagher began learning to play alto saxophone, bass, mandolin, banjo, and the Coral electric sitar with varying degrees of proficiency. By his mid-teens, he began experimenting heavily with different blues styles.

Gallagher began playing after school with Irish showbands, while still a young teenager. In 1963, he joined one named Fontana, a sextet playing the popular hit songs of the day. The band toured Ireland and the United Kingdom, earning the money for the payments that were due on his Stratocaster guitar. Gallagher began to influence the band's repertoire, beginning its transition from mainstream pop music, skirting along some of Chuck Berry's songs and by 1965, he had successfully moulded Fontana into "The Impact", with a change in their line-up into an R&B group that played gigs in Ireland and Spain until disbanding in London. Gallagher left with the bassist Oliver Tobin and drummer Johnny Campbell to perform as a trio in Hamburg, Germany. In 1966, Gallagher returned to Ireland and, experimenting with other musicians in Cork, decided to form his own band.

Taste

Having completed a musical apprenticeship in the showbands, and influenced by the increasing popularity of beat groups during the early 1960s, Gallagher formed "The Taste", which was later renamed simply, "Taste", a blues rock and R&B power trio, in 1966. Initially, the band was composed of Gallagher and two Cork musicians, Eric Kitteringham (died 2013) and Norman Damery. However, by 1968, they were replaced with two musicians from Belfast, featuring Gallagher on guitar and vocals, drummer John Wilson, and bassist Richard McCracken.

Performing extensively in the UK, the group played regularly at the Marquee Club, supporting both Cream at their Royal Albert Hall farewell concert, and the blues supergroup Blind Faith on a tour of North America. Managed by Eddie Kennedy, the trio released the albums Taste and On The Boards, and two live recordings, Live Taste and Live at the Isle of Wight.

The band broke up shortly after their appearance at the 1970 Isle of Wight Festival, and the live album from the festival was released a year later. Creative differences and an issue with management led to the band breaking up, with Gallagher stating that "we just came to the end of our natural life. The drummer wanted to play jazz and I wanted to play blues. We also had management problems that went on to cause me terrible legal hassles; I couldn't play for six months after Taste split up because of the contract I was under". In a later interview in 1977, he was more forthright: "Everything went amicably, but I did want to get rid of my manager, a real bastard. That is when he passed on all those stories, to defame me". Rory Gallagher's brother Dónal, who took on the role of his manager, insisted they bring his previous manager, Eddie Kennedy, to court to recoup royalty payments. The episode made Gallagher reluctant to seek out 'big' management deals in future, and he later turned down an approach from Led Zeppelin's manager, Peter Grant.

Towards the end of the band's existence, relations were strained. Wilson refused to go back onstage for an encore at a gig in Glasgow, and Gallagher claims they were not talking to each other at the Isle of Wight Festival. They played their final gig together around Christmas 1970.

Solo career
After the break-up of Taste, Gallagher toured under his own name, hiring former Deep Joy bass player Gerry McAvoy to play on Gallagher's self-titled debut album, Rory Gallagher.

It was the beginning of a twenty-year musical relationship between Gallagher and McAvoy; the other band member was drummer Wilgar Campbell. The 1970s were Gallagher's most prolific period. He produced ten albums in that decade, including two live albums, Live! in Europe and Irish Tour '74. November 1971 saw the release of the album Deuce.

In 1972, he was voted Melody Maker'''s Guitarist/Musician of the Year. However, despite a number of his albums from this period reaching the UK Albums Chart, Gallagher did not attain major star status.

Gallagher played and recorded what he said was "in me all the time, and not just something I turn on ...". Though he sold over thirty million albums worldwide, it was his marathon live performances that won him greatest acclaim. He is documented in Irish Tour '74, a film directed by Tony Palmer.

During the heightened periods of political unrest in Northern Ireland, as other artists were warned not to tour, Gallagher was resolute about playing there at least once a year during his career. In 1974, they stayed in the Europa hotel in Belfast, which was known as "the most bombed hotel in Europe". This approach won him the dedication of thousands of fans, and in the process, he became a role model for other aspiring young Irish musicians.

Gallagher said in several interviews that there were not any international Irish acts until Van Morrison and he, and later Phil Lynott and Thin Lizzy. The line-up which included Rod de'Ath on drums and Lou Martin on keyboards, performed together between 1973 and 1976. However, he eventually dropped down to just bass, guitar and drums, and his act became a power trio. In January 1975, when the Rolling Stones gathered in Rotterdam, Netherlands, to continue working towards their album Black and Blue they auditioned new guitarists, to replace Mick Taylor, as they recorded. Gallagher went over for a jam with the band "just to see what was going on," but did not join the group, happy with his solo career.

In 1975, Gallagher's contract with Polydor came to an end, and he signed with Chrysalis Records. At the time, it was hope that Chrysalis "wanted to give him the close, personal attention that he never really had before. [They] wanted to go all-out with him." Some early interaction with Chrysalis showed that Gallagher liked to keep tight artistic control over his work: while making Calling Card, he resisted producer Roger Glover's effort to make a cleaner sound, rejected the mixes made by Elliot Mazer and "hit the roof" when Chris Wright suggested that the song Edged in Blue be cut in length to make it a single and the album's name be changed to match it. Other releases from the Chrysalis period include Photo-Finish, and Top Priority.

The Gallagher band performed several TV and radio shows across Europe, including Beat-Club in Bremen, Germany and the Old Grey Whistle Test. He recorded two "Peel Sessions" (both February 1973 and containing the same tracks), but only the first was broadcast. Along with Little Feat and Roger McGuinn, Gallagher performed the first Rockpalast live concert at the Grugahalle, Essen, Germany in 1977.

Gallagher collaborated with Jerry Lee Lewis and Muddy Waters on their respective London Sessions in the mid-1970s. He played on Lonnie Donegan's 1978 album Puttin' on the Style.

In the 1980s he continued recording, producing Jinx, Defender, and Fresh Evidence. After Fresh Evidence, he embarked on a tour of the United States. In addition he played with Box of Frogs, a band formed in 1983 by former members of The Yardbirds. Becoming obsessive over details and plagued by self-doubt, Gallagher nevertheless retained a loyal fanbase. During this period he stated "I agonize too much".Notes From San Francisco, an album of unreleased studio tracks and a San Francisco 1979 concert, was released in May 2011.

Band line-up
In addition to Gallagher himself (on guitar and vocals), over the years Gallagher's band included:
 1971–1972: Gerry McAvoy, bass guitarist, and drummer Wilgar Campbell.
 1972–1978: Gerry McAvoy (bass), keyboardist Lou Martin, and drummer Rod de'Ath.
 1978–1981: Gerry McAvoy (bass), Ted McKenna (drums)
 1981–1991: Gerry McAvoy (bass), Brendan O'Neill (drums) + frequent guest: Mark Feltham (harmonica)
 1992–1994: David Levy (bass), Jim Leverton (keyboards), John Cooke (keyboards), Richard Newman (drums) and frequent guest Mark Feltham, on harmonica.

Guitars and equipment

Stratocaster

Gallagher played a worn sunburst 1961 Stratocaster (Serial Number 64351) for some years. It was reputedly the first in Ireland, and originally owned by Jim Conlon, lead guitarist in the Irish band Royal Showband. Gallagher bought it second-hand from Crowley's Music Shop of Cork's McCurtain Street in August 1963 for just under £100.The shop was at 10 Merchants Quay at the time of purchase. Speaking about Gallagher's purchase, his brother Dónal recalled: "His dream ambition was to have a guitar like Buddy Holly. This Stratocaster was in the store as a used instrument, it was 100 pounds. In today's money you couldn't even compare; you might as well say it was a million pounds. My mother was saying we'll be in debt for the rest of our lives and Rory said, 'Well, actually with a guitar like this I can play both parts, rhythm and lead, we won't need a rhythm player so I can earn more money and pay it off.' So the Stratocaster became his partner for life if you like."

Virtually all of the finish on Gallagher's Stratocaster was stripped away over time, and, while he took care to keep the guitar in playable condition, Gallagher never had it restored, stating "the less paint or varnish on a guitar, acoustic or electric, the better. The wood breathes more. But it’s all psychological. I just like the sound of it". Gallagher's brother Dónal has also stated that, owing to his rare blood type , Gallagher's sweat was unusually acidic, acting to prematurely age the instrument's paintwork.

The guitar was extensively modified by Gallagher. The tuning pegs and the nut were replaced, the latter changed a number of times. The pickguard was also changed during Gallagher's time with Taste. Only the middle pick-up is original. The final modification was the wiring – Gallagher disconnected the bottom tone pot and rewired it so he had just a master tone control along with the master volume control. He installed a five-way selector switch in place of the vintage three-way type.

In late October 2011, Dónal Gallagher brought the guitar out of retirement to allow Joe Bonamassa to perform with it on his two nights at the Hammersmith Apollo in London. Bonamassa opened both night's performances with his rendition of "Cradle Rock" using Gallagher's Stratocaster.

Other equipment

Known for his Stratocaster, Gallagher also used a number of other guitars, including acoustic examples, during his career. In April 2014 one of the last guitars owned by Gallagher, a custom-built Patrick Eggle 'JS Berlin Legend', was sold at auction in England for £25,000.

Gallagher used a number of models of amplifiers during his career, generally preferring smaller 'combo' amplifiers to more powerful Marshall 'stacks' popular with rock and hard rock guitarists. To make up for the relative lack of power on stage, he would link several different combo amps together.

When Gallagher was with Taste, he used a single Vox AC30 with a Dallas Rangemaster treble booster plugged into the 'normal' input. Gallagher also used an Ibanez Tube Screamer, and several Boss effects, including a flanger.

In the 1970s, Gallagher began to use Fender amplifiers with a Hawk booster. Later in the 1970s, when Gallagher was moving towards a hard rock sound, he experimented with Ampeg VT40 and VT22 amplifiers, and also used Marshall combos.

Gallagher was an early adopter of Boss ME-5 all-in-one floor based effects units, and used such a unit for his live work until his death. He also used Stramp 2100a amplifiers, which can be seen in his appearances on the German Beat Club program. Another company that built amplifiers for Gallagher was PCL Vintage Amp.

Death
In the later years of his life, Gallagher developed a phobia of flying. To overcome this, he was prescribed various drugs. Gallagher also had a series of health problems for which he was prescribed steroids (e.g. thyroid disorder, psoriasis, asthma). By the time of his final performance on 10 January 1995 in the Netherlands, he was visibly ill with severe abdominal pain and the tour had to be cancelled. He had been prescribed paracetamol for the pain, a drug that can be extremely harmful to the liver when taken in large doses and for long periods of time.

Gallagher was admitted to London's King's College Hospital in March 1995, and it was only then that the extent of his ill health became apparent; his liver was failing and the doctors determined that, in spite of his relatively young age, a liver transplant was the only possible course of action. After thirteen weeks in intensive care, while waiting to be transferred to a convalescent home, his health suddenly worsened when he contracted a staphylococcal (MRSA) infection, and he died on 14 June 1995, at the age of 47. He was unmarried and had no children.

Gallagher was buried in St Oliver's Cemetery, on the Clash Road just outside Ballincollig near Cork City, Ireland. The grave's headstone is in the image of an award he received in 1972 for International Guitarist of the Year.

Legacy
In 2003, Wheels Within Wheels, a collection of acoustic tracks, was released posthumously by Gallagher's brother Dónal. Collaborators on this album included Bert Jansch, Martin Carthy, The Dubliners, Spanish flamenco guitarist Juan Martin and Lonnie Donegan.

Many modern-day musicians, including The Edge from U2, Slash of Guns N' Roses, Johnny Marr of the Smiths, Davy Knowles, Janick Gers of Iron Maiden, Alex Lifeson of Rush, James Dean Bradfield of Manic Street Preachers, Glenn Tipton of Judas Priest, Vivian Campbell of Def Leppard, Gary Moore, and Joe Bonamassa, cite Gallagher as an inspiration in their formative musical years.

Brian May, lead guitarist of Queen, relates: "so these couple of kids come up, who's me and my mate, and say 'How do you get your sound Mr Gallagher?' and he sits and tells us. So I owe Rory Gallagher my sound." The sound to which May refers consists of a Dallas Rangemaster Treble Booster in combination with a Vox AC30 amplifier. In 2010, Gallagher was ranked No. 42 on Gibson.com's List of their Top 50 Guitarists of All Time. Gallagher was also listed on Rolling Stone magazine's list of the 100 Greatest Guitarists of All Time, at 57th place. In April 2014, at the time of the auction of Gallagher's Patrick Eggle "JS Berlin Legend" guitar, the BBC noted: "Eric Clapton credited him with 'getting me back into the blues.'"

Tributes

 On 25 October 1997 a tribute sculpture to Gallagher was unveiled in the newly renamed Rory Gallagher Place (formerly St. Paul's St. Square) in his hometown of Cork. The sculptor, Geraldine Creedon, was a childhood friend of Gallagher.

 Rory Gallagher Corner, at Meeting House Square in Dublin's Temple Bar, is marked with a full-size bronze representation of his Stratocaster. The unveiling was attended by The Edge of U2 and the Lord Mayor of Dublin, among others.
 In 2004, the Rory Gallagher Music Library was opened in Cork.
 In 2006, a plaque was unveiled at the Ulster Hall in Belfast.
 A street in Ris-Orangis, a commune in the southern suburbs of Paris, was renamed Rue Rory Gallagher.
 New York City-based Celtic rock band Black 47 paid tribute to Rory Gallagher on their 1996 release, "Green Suede Shoes". The track titled "Rory" features vocalist and guitarist Larry Kirwan delivering a tribute to Gallagher.
 Flynn Amps manufacture a Rory Gallagher signature Hawk pedal, cloned from Gallagher's 1970s pedal.
Christy Moore released a song on his 2009 album Listen titled 'Rory is Gone', which pays tribute to Gallagher's life.
On 2 June 2010, a life-sized bronze statue of Gallagher, made by Scottish sculptor David Annand, was unveiled in the town centre of Ballyshannon. An award-winning annual blues festival is held in his honour in the same town.
 In 2015 Fender produced the Rory Gallagher Signature Stratocaster.
 In October 2016, approval was given to put up a statue of Gallagher on Bedford Street, near Ulster Hall in Belfast.

Selected discography
Gallagher released 14 albums during his lifetime as a solo act, which included 3 live albums:Rory Gallagher (1971)Deuce (1971)Live in Europe (1972)Blueprint (1973)Tattoo (1973)Irish Tour '74 (1974)Against the Grain (1975)Calling Card (1976)Photo-Finish (1978)Top Priority (1979)Stage Struck (1980)Jinx (1982)Defender (1987)Fresh Evidence'' (1990)

See also
List of people on stamps of Ireland (2002)
List of blues musicians

References

External links

 Official Rory Gallagher website
 
 Rory Live – using a BOSS ME-5 into a cranked VOX AC30
 

1948 births
1995 deaths
Blues rock musicians
Deaths from methicillin-resistant Staphylococcus aureus
Electric blues musicians
Harmonica blues musicians
Infectious disease deaths in England
Irish songwriters
Irish rock singers
Irish blues guitarists
Irish rock guitarists
Irish male guitarists
Irish mandolinists
Lead guitarists
Irish record producers
Musicians from County Donegal
Musicians from Cork (city)
Liver transplant recipients
People from Ballyshannon
Resonator guitarists
Sitar players
Slide guitarists
Skiffle musicians
Chrysalis Records artists
Atlantic Records artists
Polydor Records artists
RCA Records artists
Verve Records artists
20th-century Irish male singers
Irish blues mandolinists
20th-century guitarists
People educated at North Monastery